The 1953/1954 News of the World Snooker Tournament was a professional snooker tournament sponsored by the News of the World. The tournament was won by John Pulman who won 7 of his 8 matches and finished ahead of Joe Davis who won 5 matches. The News of the World Snooker Tournament ran from 1949/50 to 1959.

Format
The 1953/54 event was a round-robin snooker tournament and was played from 7 September 1953 to 16 January 1954. All matches were played at Leicester Square Hall in London. There were 9 competitors and a total of 36 matches. The competitors were Joe Davis, Fred Davis, Walter Donaldson, John Barrie, Albert Brown, Alec Brown, John Pulman, Jackie Rea and Rex Williams. Sidney Smith was due to participate, but withdrew before the tournament started. Each match lasted three days and was the best of 37 frames.

Each match was separately handicapped. Joe Davis played level with Fred Davis and gave Walter Donaldson 14, John Barrie, Albert Brown, Alec Brown and John Pulman 21 and Jackie Rea and Rex Williams 25. Fred Davis gave Walter Donaldson 7, Albert Brown 10, John Pulman 12, John Barrie 14, Alec Brown 16 and Jackie Rea and Rex Williams 18. Walter Donaldson gave Albert Brown 7, Alec Brown and John Pulman 12, John Barrie 14 and Jackie Rea and Rex Williams 18. Albert Brown gave Alec Brown and John Pulman 5, John Barrie 8 and Jackie Rea and Rex Williams 14. John Pulman played level with Alec Brown and gave John Barrie 7 and Jackie Rea and Rex Williams 14. John Barrie played level with Alec Brown and gave Jackie Rea 7. Alec Brown gave Jackie Rea 5 and Rex Williams 9. Jackie Rea played level with Rex Williams.

Nineteen century breaks were made during the tournament, ten of them by Joe Davis.

Results
John Pulman made certain of winning the tournament by beating John Barrie on 30 December

Fred Davis beat his brother Joe 21–16 in the final match of the tournament. Joe was already assured of second place but the win gave Fred third place.

Fred Davis scored the first century of the tournament, a break of 102, on the second day of his match against Walter Donaldson. Donaldson made a break of 120 the following day. In the next match Joe Davis made a break of 131 against Donaldson.

Table

The positions were determined firstly by the number of matches won (MW) and, in the event of a tie, the number of frames won (FW). Rex Williams was ill for his match against John Barrie from 22 to 24 October. Barrie played an exhibition match against Kingsley Kennerley instead, and was awarded a 19–18 win against Williams.

Qualifying
The qualifying tournament was played from 25 May to 13 June 1953 at Leicester Square Hall in London. There were 3 competitors: Sydney Lee, Jim Lees and Rex Williams. Matches were over 71 frames, except in the match between Lee and Williams which was over 59 frames. The qualifying was won by Rex Williams who advanced to the main event.

Qualifying results

Broadcasting
The BBC showed two short TV programmes during the matches between John Barrie and Albert Brown on 16 September, and between Walter Donaldson and Alec Brown on 12 December. The commentator on both occasions was Sidney Smith.

References

News of the World Snooker Tournament
News of the World Tournament
News of the World Tournament
News of the World Tournament
News of the World Tournament
News of the World Tournament
News of the World Tournament